

1988

See also 
 1988 in Australia
 1988 in Australian television

External links 
 Australian film at the Internet Movie Database

References

1988
Australia
Films